Raw Deal may refer to:

 Raw Deal (1948 film), an American film noir starring Claire Trevor and directed by Anthony Mann
 Raw Deal (1977 film), an Australian western starring Gerard Kennedy
 Raw Deal (1986 film), an American action film starring Arnold Schwarzenegger
 Raw Deal (1991 film), an American crime drama
 Raw Deal (band), later Killing Time, an American hardcore punk band
 Raw Deal (card game), a collectible card game based on the WWE
 "Raw Deal" (Justified), an episode of the TV series Justified
 Raw Deal, a 1991 album by Gringos Locos featuring Ben Granfelt
 Raw Deal, a 1986 album by Sonny Burgess